Prices Branch is a stream in Montgomery County in the U.S. state of Missouri.

Prices Branch has the name of Lemuel Price, a pioneer citizen.

See also
List of rivers of Missouri

References

Rivers of Montgomery County, Missouri
Rivers of Missouri